GNZ may refer to:

 Ganzi language
 Ghanzi Airport, in Botswana
 Gliding New Zealand